Samuel Weaver may refer to:

Samuel Weaver (footballer)
Samuel Weaver (Ruby Ridge)
Samuel Weaver (baseball)